Seth Anandram Jaipuria College is a public college, affiliated to the University of Calcutta. It was inaugurated by Pt. Jawaharlal Nehru in 1945 at 10, Raja Nabakrishna Street in North Kolkata. It runs three shifts: Morning, Day, and Evening. The college is serving society and the nation since its inception.  

The college offers both undergraduate and post-graduate courses in a number of subjects in the three streams of arts, science, and commerce. It runs three shifts- Morning, Day, and Evening. It is accredited with an (A) grade by the National Assessment and Accreditation Council (NAAC). This college serves the fundamental right of a human being, education, at a very affordable cost.

The college offers both undergraduate and post-graduate courses in a number of subjects in the three streams of arts, science, and commerce.

History
Seth Anandram Jaipuria College ( শেঠ আনন্দরাম জয়পুরিয়া কলেজ ) was founded by Sri Mangturam Jaipuria in memory of his illustrious father. It was housed in the famous Sovabazar Rajbari, a landmark in the cultural history of the city of Kolkata. The College, since its inception, has been associated with many eminent personalities who were involved in the Indian Nationalist Movement. One of them, Pt. Jawaharlal Nehru, inaugurated the College on 22 December 1945.

In memory of the illustrious founder of the college, Late Seth Mangturam Jaipuria, the trust and the governing body of the college award gold medals annually to the successful students who secure the highest marks in the three disciplines of arts, science, and commerce in the university examinations.

Notable alumni
Santanu Chaudhuri, director of Manufacturing Science and Engineering, Argonne National Laboratory
Subhasish Mukhopadhyay, comedian and actor
Abhishek Chatterjee, actor
Sreelekha Mitra, actress
Joydeep Karmakar, Olympian 
Abhishek Jhunjhunwala, cricketer
Anustup Majumdar, cricketer
Priyanka Roy, cricketer

See also 
List of colleges affiliated to the University of Calcutta
Education in India
Education in West Bengal

Notes

References

External links
 Official Website of Seth Anandaram Jaipuria College (SAJC)
 Official Admission Website of Seth Anandaram Jaipuria Collegel

Universities and colleges in Kolkata
Educational institutions established in 1945
University of Calcutta affiliates
1945 establishments in India